Babyflot is the informal name given to any airline in the former Soviet Union created in the early 1990s from the dissolution of the Soviet airline monopoly held by Aeroflot, at the time of the breakup of the Soviet Union. The word is a portmanteau of baby and Aeroflot (compare Baby Bells).

In 1992 Aeroflot was divided into more than 300 regional and other smaller airlines, with many being single-plane operations. International routes were operated separately as Aeroflot—Russian International Airlines (ARIA). Some airline companies created from the old Aeroflot are now flag carriers of independent post-Soviet countries, such as Uzbekistan Airlines.

Fall of the Babyflots
There were over 800 such airlines at one time with many of them subsequently closing down due to abysmal safety records in 1994. 118 carriers went out of business because fewer passengers could afford to fly in 1995.

By 2000, Russia had only about eight federal air carriers and 40 to 45 regional airlines – down sharply from the current 315 carriers, said Ivan Valov, first deputy chief of the Russian Federal Aviation Service. The government began to restrict licensing and certification and bring air-safety standards into compliance with international standards. The "Babyflot" airlines have been blamed for a sharp decline in Russia's air safety. Many of the crashes that occurred have been blamed on poor maintenance and lax controls at many small carriers, which have neglected flight safety in their run for profit.

The eight hundred-odd "Babyflot" airlines had such poor safety records that in 1994 the International Air Transport Association took the unusual step of recommending train travel as the least life-threatening form of conveyance in the former Soviet Union.

List of babyflots

 2nd Arkhangelsk United Aviation Division
 2nd Sverdlovsk Air Enterprise
 ARP 410 Airlines  
 ATRAN
 Abakan Avia
 Abkhazian Airlines
 Aeroflot
 Air Kazakhstan
 Air Kharkov
 Air Ukraine
 Air Volga
 Arkhangelsk Airlines
 Baikal Airlines
 BAL Bashkirian Airlines
 Belavia
 Belgorod Air Enterprise
 Bravia (Bryansk Air Enterprise)
 Bugulma Air Enterprise
 Bural
 Chitaavia
 Dagestan Airlines
 Dalavia
 Domodedovo Airlines
 Donavia
 Estonian Air
 FlyLal
 Georgian Airways
 Izhavia
 Kazakhstan Airlines
 Kazan Air Enterprise
 Kemerovo Aviation Enterprise
 Komiaviatrans
 KrasAir
 Kuban Airlines
 Latavio
 Mavial Magadan Airlines
 Nefteyugansk Air Enterprise
 Nikolaevsk-Na-Amure Air Enterprise
 Novosibirsk Air Enterprise
 Omskavia
 Orenburg Airlines
 Perm Airlines
 Petropavlovsk-Kamchatsky Air Enterprise
 Polar Airlines
 Pskovavia
 Pulkovo Airlines
 SAT Airlines
 Samara Airlines
 Saransk Air Enterprise
 Saravia
 Siberia Airlines (now S7 Airlines)
 Tomskavia
 Ural Airlines 
 UTair Aviation
 Uzbekistan Airways
 Vladivostok Air
 Voronezhavia

References

Further reading
Tavernise, Sabrina. "TRAVEL ADVISORY: CORRESPONDENT'S REPORT; Aeroflot Without Fear In Today's Russia." The New York Times. October 20, 2002.

External links

"Russia Says 'Babyflot' Era is Over" Moscow Times. Saturday January 17, 1998.
S7: Bringing Siberia Airlines In From The Cold
An Open Letter to AeroSvit, Ukrainian Airlines
DK World Reports RUSSIA

 
Aeroflot
Former Aeroflot divisions
Airlines of Russia